James Mellen (born January 1, 1996) in Schnecksville) is an American Sprint track cyclist representing the United States.  Mellen is a current US National Record holder in the 200m Flying Time Trial and an 11-time US National Champion.  

Mellen graduated cum laude from The Pennsylvania State University-Schreyer Honors College in 2018 with a degree in Biomedical Engineering.

Career 
In 2013 and 2014 James Mellen competed at the UCI Junior Track World Championships.  

In 2015 Mellen won his first USA Cycling National Championship, in the team sprint with Matthew Baranoski and David Espinoza. The following year he won two titles, in Keirin and also in Team Sprint (with James Alvord and David Espinoza). In 2017 and 2019 was the National Champion in Sprint and [Keirin]. At the 2019 Pan American Championships he set a new national record of 9.598 seconds over 200 metres.

Major results 
2012
  US Junior National Track Champion – 500m Time Trial
2013
  US Junior National Track Champion – Sprint and Team Sprint (with Calan Farley and Tyler Nothstein)
2014
  US Junior National Track Champion – Team Sprint (with Dominic Suozzi and Edward Alex Horvet)
2015
  US National Track Champion – Team Sprint (with Matthew Baranoski and David Espinoza)
2016
  US National Track Champion – Keirin, Team Sprint (with James Alvord and David Espinoza)
2017
  US National Track Champion – Sprint, Keirin
2019
  US National Track Champion – Sprint, Keirin

External links

References 

1996 births
Living people
American male cyclists
American track cyclists
Sportspeople from Pennsylvania